Pantano may refer to:

Pantano (surname)
Pantano, Arizona, a ghost town in Pima County, Arizona, United States
Pântano River, a river of Brazil

See also
El Pantano, a corregimiento in Santa Fé District, Veraguas Province, Panama